Abot-Kamay na Pangarap is a Philippine television drama series broadcast by GMA Network. The series is based on the 1996 film of the same title. It premiered on September 5, 2022 on the network's Afternoon Prime and Sabado Star Power sa Hapon line up replacing Apoy sa Langit.

Series overview

Episodes
<onlyinclude>
<onlyinclude>

References

Lists of Philippine drama television series episodes